The Magic Christian is a 1969 British satirical farce black comedy film directed by Joseph McGrath and starring Peter Sellers and Ringo Starr, with appearances by John Cleese, Graham Chapman, Raquel Welch, Spike Milligan, Christopher Lee, Richard Attenborough and Roman Polanski. It was loosely adapted from the 1959 comic novel The Magic Christian by the American author Terry Southern, who co-wrote the screenplay adaptation with McGrath. The film also features pre-Monty Python appearances of John Cleese (credited) and an uncredited Graham Chapman, who had jointly written an earlier version of the film script.

Songs by Badfinger, including "Come and Get It" written by Paul McCartney, were used on the soundtrack. The official soundtrack album had other music as well as dialogue from the film. Badfinger released an album, Magic Christian Music, containing their songs for the film.

The film received mostly negative reviews on release, citing its unrelenting and heavy-handed satire of capitalism, greed and human vanities.

Plot 
Sir Guy Grand, an eccentric billionaire, together with his newly adopted heir (a homeless man sleeping in the park), Youngman Grand, start playing elaborate practical jokes on people. A big spender, Grand does not mind handing out large sums of money to various people, bribing them to fulfill his whims, or shocking them by bringing down what they hold dear. Their misadventures are designed as a display by Grand to his adoptive charge of the notion that "everyone has their price" — it just depends on the amount one is prepared to pay. They start from rather minor spoofs, like bribing a Shakespearean actor to strip during a stage performance of Hamlet and persuading a traffic warden to take back a parking ticket and eat it (delighted by the size of the bribe, he eats its plastic cover too) and proceed with increasingly elaborate stunts involving higher social strata and wider audiences. As their conversation reveals, Grand sees his plots as "educational".

At Sotheby's art auction house, it is confided to Grand that an original portrait from the Rembrandt School might fetch £10,000 at auction. To the astonishment of the director, Mr. Dugdale, Grand makes a pre-auction bid of £30,000 (£ today) for the painting and, having bought it, proceeds to cut the portrait's nose from the canvas with a pair of scissors, as a mortified Dugdale looks on in open-mouthed shock. In an elegant restaurant, he makes a loud show of wild gluttony, Grand being the restaurant's most prominent customer. In the annual Boat Race sports event, he bribes the coach of the Oxford rowing team to have them purposely ram the Cambridge boat, to win a screamingly unjust victory. In a traditional pheasant hunt, he uses an anti-aircraft gun to down the bird.

Guy and Youngman eventually buy tickets for the luxury liner The Magic Christian, along with the richest stratum of society. Guests seen boarding the ship include John Lennon, Yoko Ono, Jacqueline Kennedy and Aristotle Onassis (all played by lookalikes). In the beginning everything appears normal, and the ship apparently sets off. Soon, things start going wrong. A solitary drinker at the bar is approached by a transvestite cabaret singer, a vampire poses as a waiter, and a cinema film features the unsuccessful transplant of a black person's head onto a white person's body. Passengers begin to notice, through the ship's closed-circuit television, that their captain is in a drunken stupor and is carted off by a gorilla. In a crescendo of panic, the guests try to abandon ship. A group of them, shown the way by Youngman Grand, instead reach the machine room. There, the Priestess of the Whip, assisted by two topless drummers, commands more than a hundred slave girls. They are naked except for loincloths. Rowing five to an oar, their wrists are manacled and fastened by chains to the ceiling. As passengers finally find an exit, and lords and ladies stumble out in the daylight, it is discovered that the supposed ship was in fact a structure built inside a warehouse, and the passengers had never left London. As they break out, a large painted sign reading "SMASH CAPITALISM" can be seen on the inside wall of the warehouse. During the whole misadventure, the Grands look perfectly composed and cool.

Toward the end of the film, Guy fills up a huge vat with urine, blood and animal excrement and adds to it thousands of bank notes. Attracting a crowd of onlookers by announcing "Free money!", Grand successfully entices the city's workers to recover the cash. The sequence concludes with many members of the crowd submerging themselves, in order to retrieve money that had sunk beneath the surface, as the song "Something in the Air" by Thunderclap Newman is heard by the film's audience.

The film ends with both Guy and Youngman, having returned to the park where the film opened, bribing the park warden to allow them to sleep there, stating that this was a more direct method of achieving their (mostly unstated) ends.

Cast

 Peter Sellers as Sir Guy Grand KG, KC, CBE
 Ringo Starr as Youngman Grand, Esq.
 Isabel Jeans as Dame Agnes Grand
 Caroline Blakiston as Hon. Esther Grand
 Spike Milligan as Traffic warden #27
 Richard Attenborough as Oxford coach
 Leonard Frey as Laurence Faggot (ship's psychiatrist)
 John Cleese as Mr. Dugdale (director in Sotheby's)
 Patrick Cargill as Auctioneer at Sotheby's
 Joan Benham as Socialite in Sotheby's
 Ferdy Mayne as Edouard (of Chez Edouard restaurant)
 Graham Stark as Waiter at Chez Edouard Restaurant
 Laurence Harvey as Hamlet
 Dennis Price as Winthrop
 Wilfrid Hyde-White as Capt. Reginald K. Klaus
 Christopher Lee as Ship's vampire
 Roman Polanski as Solitary drinker
 Raquel Welch as Priestess of the Whip
 Victor Maddern as Hot dog vendor
 Terence Alexander as Mad Major
 Peter Bayliss as Pompous Toff
 Clive Dunn as Sommelier
 Fred Emney as Fitzgibbon
 David Hutcheson as Lord Barry
 Hattie Jacques as Ginger Horton
 Edward Underdown as Prince Henry
 Jeremy Lloyd as Lord Hampton
 Peter Myers as Lord Kilgallon		
 Roland Culver as Sir Herbert
 Michael Trubshawe as Sir Lionel
 David Lodge as Ship's guide
 Peter Graves as Lord at ship's bar (uncredited)
 Robert Raglan as Maltravers
 Frank Thornton as Police Inspector (uncredited)
 Michael Aspel as TV commentator (uncredited)
 Michael Barratt as TV commentator (uncredited)
 Harry Carpenter as TV commentator (uncredited)
 John Snagge as TV commentator (uncredited)
 Alan Whicker as TV commentator (uncredited)
 Graham Chapman as Oxford crewman (uncredited)
 James Laurenson as Oxford crewman (uncredited)
 Yul Brynner as Transvestite cabaret singer (uncredited)	
 John Le Mesurier as Sir John (uncredited)
 Guy Middleton as Duke of Mantisbriar (uncredited)
 Nosher Powell as Ike Jones (uncredited)
 Rita Webb as Woman in Park (uncredited)
 Jimmy Clitheroe as Passenger on Ship (uncredited)
 Sean Barry-Weske as John Lennon lookalike (uncredited)
 Kimberley Chung as Yoko Ono lookalike (uncredited)
 George Cooper as Losing Boxer's Second (uncredited)
 Rosemarie Hillcrest as Topless Galley Slave (uncredited)
 Edward Sinclair as Park attendant (uncredited)

Production

Writing
Although Joseph McGrath co-wrote the adaptation with the American author Terry Southern, who wrote the original 1959 comic novel The Magic Christian, the screenplay differs considerably in content from the novel such as moving the story from America to London in the Swinging Sixties. Likewise the Youngman character was not in the original book, but was created for the film, with many of Sir Guy's early exploits in the novel adapted as Youngman's in the film.

Casting
Peter Sellers, who was cast as Sir Guy Grand, was known to have liked the book because it was how Terry Southern was hired by Stanley Kubrick to co-write Dr. Strangelove in 1964. After Sellers sent Kubrick a copy of The Magic Christian, he decided to make the film as a black comedy/satire, rather than a straightforward thriller. The role of the orphan was played by Ringo Starr; it was written with John Lennon in mind.  Starr and Sellers became good friends during the shoot. The film also features a host of British and American actors with brief roles in the film, many playing against type.

Filming
The British actor and dancer Lionel Blair was responsible for the film's choreography.

The scene involving the vat containing animal blood, urine and excrement was filmed at London's South Bank on a stretch of waste ground on which the National Theatre was later built. It was originally planned to film this climactic scene at the Statue of Liberty in New York, and (remarkably) the U.S. National Park Service agreed to a request to permit this. Sellers, Southern and McGrath travelled to New York on the Queen Elizabeth 2 (at a reported cost of US $10,000 [$ today] per person) but the studio refused to pay for the shoot, and it had to be relocated to London.

Soundtrack
The film features the song "Come and Get It" written and produced by Paul McCartney and performed by Badfinger, a Welsh rock band promoted by Apple Records. The lyrics refer to Grand's schemes of bribing people to act according to his whims ("If you want it, here it is, come and get it").

"Something in the Air" by Thunderclap Newman is used in the film.

Reception
Most mainstream critics have been quite negative about the film, especially for its extensive use of black humour. Darrel Baxton, in his review for The Spinning Image, refers to the film as of "the school of savage sub-Bunuelian satire".

Christopher Null on filmcritic.com states that "it is way too over-the-top to make any profound statement".

Among retrospective reviews, Jay Gent of We Are Cult writes:[On] its own merits The Magic Christian is a real curio of its time, with enough celebrity cameos and ‘60s British Cinema, Beatles and Python connections to appeal to a cross-section of fandoms for cultural and historical interest alone. And it’s good fun: Daft, silly, flawed, patchy, but rarely dull, with Sellers and Starr carrying the film with their infectious personalities alone – for better or worse, a shining example of “They don’t make them like that any more” and “Drugs in the sixties must have been REALLY good!”

In popular culture
 The episode of The Simpsons television series titled "Homer vs. Dignity" (2000) follows the film's plot.
 The writer Grant Morrison named The Magic Christian as an inspiration for their Batman Incorporated series.

DVD/Blu-ray
The Magic Christian was released on DVD and Blu-ray by Olive Films on 28 May 2013.

References

External links
 
 
 

1969 films
1960s black comedy films
British black comedy films
British satirical films
Films based on American novels
Films directed by Joseph McGrath (film director)
Films set in London
Films set on ships
Films shot in London
Films with screenplays by Terry Southern
Cultural depictions of John Lennon
Cultural depictions of Yoko Ono
Cultural depictions of Aristotle Onassis
Cultural depictions of Jacqueline Kennedy Onassis
1969 comedy films
1969 drama films
Films scored by Ken Thorne
1960s English-language films
1960s British films